Agustín Federico Marchesín (born 16 March 1988) is an Argentine professional footballer who plays as a goalkeeper for Spanish club RC Celta de Vigo and the Argentina national team.

He began his career with Lanús, making 222 appearances and winning the Copa Sudamericana in 2013. He then spent several years in Mexico's Liga MX, winning league titles with Santos Laguna and Club América, before joining Porto in 2019. He won the Primeira Liga and Taça de Portugal double twice, and moved to Celta Vigo in 2022.

Marchesín made his international debut for Argentina in 2011, and was part of their squads at three Copa América tournaments. They came runners-up in 2015, third in 2019 and won in 2021.

Club career

Lanús
In 2007, Marchesín was signed by Club Atlético Lanús from regional club Huracán de Tres Arroyos (which he was already a first team member since 2005, but did not play). He was a non-playing member of the Lanús squad that won the 2007 Apertura tournament.

On 1 March 2009, Marchesín made his competitive debut in a 2–0 win against Gimnasia y Esgrima de Jujuy. On 29 April, he made his first appearance in the Copa Libertadores, a 1–1 draw against Caracas FC. That year, he relegated Mauricio Caranta to the bench and established himself as first-choice goalkeeper, playing in most of Lanús' games of the Apertura tournament.

In 2013, Marchesín won the Copa Sudamericana with Lanús, starting in both matches of the finals against Ponte Preta of Brazil.

Santos Laguna

In December 2014, Marchesín, along with Lanús teammate Diego González, was sold to Mexican side Santos Laguna as a replacement for retiring goalkeeper Oswaldo Sánchez. In his first year at the club, he won the 2015 Clausura and 2015 Campeón de Campeones cup.

América
On 2 December 2016, it was announced that Santos Laguna had sold Marchesín to Club América.

Marchesín made his 100th league appearance in Mexico in América's 2–1 win against Toluca on 30 September 2017.

On 16 December 2018, Marchesín won his first league title with América following a 2–0 aggregate victory over Cruz Azul in the Apertura finals.

Porto
On 31 July 2019, Marchesín moved to Portugal's FC Porto on a four-year deal, for an undisclosed amount reported as €7.2 million. He joined as a replacement for Iker Casillas, who had suffered a heart attack in May. He made his debut on 7 August in the first leg of the third qualifying round of the UEFA Champions League away to FC Krasnodar in Russia, making a late save from Rémy Cabella. He was the Primeira Liga Goalkeeper of the Month in each of his first four months. Porto won the league and Taça de Portugal double, and he was named Goalkeeper of the Year and made the Team of the Year. In November 2019, he missed the local derby with Boavista F.C. due to internal suspension for having partied until early in the morning with teammates Luis Díaz, Mateus Uribe and Renzo Saravia.

Marchesín missed the start of the 2021–22 season through a meniscus injury to his right knee, and was replaced by youngster Diogo Costa. In a title-winning campaign, he played only three minutes in a 2–0 win at F.C. Arouca on 6 February. Five days later, he was one of four players sent off in a melee at the end of a 2–2 draw with Sporting CP, and was handed a two-game suspension; on 7 December he was also dismissed without playing in a similar event against Atlético Madrid in the Champions League group stage.

Marchesín was first-choice as Porto won the 2021–22 Taça de Portugal, including the 3–1 final win over C.D. Tondela on 22 May. On 30 July, days before leaving the club, he played in the 2022 Supertaça Cândido de Oliveira win over the same opposition due to Costa's suspension.

Celta
On 2 August 2022, La Liga side RC Celta de Vigo signed Marchesín on a three-year deal with the option of one more. He made his debut 11 days later as the season began with a 2–2 home draw against RCD Espanyol, conceding the equaliser from Joselu's penalty in the seventh minute of added time.

International career

Marchesín was the starting goalkeeper for the Argentina national U21 team that finished third at the 2009 Toulon Tournament. On 20 August 2010, Marchesín received his first call for the senior national team for a friendly match against Spain. Marchesín got his first cap in a friendly match against Venezuela as a half-time substitute for Javier Hernán García on 16 March 2011, with Argentina winning the match 4–1 in San Juan.

In September 2014, Marchesín received his first call-up in more than three years when Gerardo Martino called him up for the friendly matches against Brazil and Hong Kong, playing against the latter and earning his second cap. He was called up for the 2015 Copa América after Mariano Andújar suffered a hand injury midway through the tournament.

On 15 September 2017, Marchesín received his first call-up under Jorge Sampaoli for the 2018 FIFA World Cup Qualification matches against Peru and Ecuador on 2 and 5 October. On 14 November, he made his first start for the national team in a 4–2 friendly loss to Nigeria in Krasnodar, Russia.

In May 2019, Marchesín was included in Argentina's 23-man squad for the 2019 Copa América. He was also named in the 28-man squad for the 2021 edition, which they won for the first time since 1993. On 8 June that year, he made his competitive debut when Emiliano Martínez was injured in a 2022 FIFA World Cup qualification match away to Colombia, and made an added-time error that allowed Miguel Borja to make it 2–2.

Career statistics

Club

International

Honours
Lanús
Copa Sudamericana: 2013

Santos Laguna
Liga MX: Clausura 2015
Campeón de Campeones: 2015

América
Liga MX: Apertura 2018
Copa MX: Clausura 2019
Campeón de Campeones: 2019

Porto
Primeira Liga: 2019–20, 2021–22
Taça de Portugal: 2019–20, 2021–22
Supertaça Cândido de Oliveira: 2020, 2022
Argentina
Copa América: 2021
Individual
Toulon Tournament Best Goalkeeper: 2009
Ubaldo Fillol Award: Torneo Inicial 2012
Liga MX Golden Glove: 2015–16, 2018–19
Liga MX Best XI: Apertura 2017, Clausura 2018, Apertura 2018
Primeira Liga Goalkeeper of the Month: August 2019, September 2019, October/November 2019, December 2019
Primeira Liga Team of the Year: 2019–20
Primeira Liga Goalkeeper of the Year: 2019–20

References

External links

Agustín Marchesín at ESPN Deportes 

1988 births
Living people
Sportspeople from Buenos Aires Province
Argentine footballers
Association football goalkeepers
Argentine Primera División players
Huracán de Tres Arroyos footballers
Club Atlético Lanús footballers
Argentine expatriate footballers
Argentine expatriate sportspeople in Mexico
Expatriate footballers in Mexico
Argentine expatriate sportspeople in Portugal
Expatriate footballers in Portugal
Argentine expatriate sportspeople in Spain
Expatriate footballers in Spain
Santos Laguna footballers
Club América footballers
FC Porto players
RC Celta de Vigo players
Liga MX players
Primeira Liga players
La Liga players
Argentina international footballers
2015 Copa América players
2019 Copa América players
2021 Copa América players
Copa América-winning players